Colchicum cupanii is a widespread species of flowering plant in the family Colchicaceae, known as the Mediterranean meadow saffron. It grows around much of the central Mediterranean Basin, reported from France, Sardinia, Italy, Albania, Greece, Montenegro, Croatia, Sicily, Algeria, Malta and Tunisia.

Colchicum cupanii is quite variable.  Some specimens have flowers that open completely to a star shape, while others remain cup-shaped. The pink to purple, untessellated flowers are small, up to 3 cm (1") in diameter, but are produced in abundance in the fall. The foliage is also produced in the fall.

Subspecies
Two subspecies are recognized:

Colchicum cupanii subsp. cupanii 
Colchicum cupanii subsp. glossophyllum (Heldr.) Rouy - Greece, Albania, Montenegro

References

cupani
Plants described in 1827
Flora of France
Flora of Southeastern Europe
Flora of Algeria
Flora of Tunisia